Vadym Ihorovych Yanchak (born 7 February 1999) is a Ukrainian football player. He plays for FC Oleksandriya.

Club career
He made his Ukrainian Second League debut for Lviv on 19 August 2017 in a game against Nyva Vinnytsia.

References

External links
 

1999 births
People from Sambir
Living people
Ukrainian footballers
Ukrainian expatriate footballers
Ukraine youth international footballers
Ukraine under-21 international footballers
Association football midfielders
FC Lviv players
FC Lokomotíva Košice players
FK Poprad players
FC Oleksandriya players
Ukrainian Premier League players
Ukrainian Second League players
Expatriate footballers in Slovakia
Ukrainian expatriate sportspeople in Slovakia
Sportspeople from Lviv Oblast